The 2018–19 Ekstraklasa was the 93rd season of the Polish Football Championship, the 85th season of the highest tier domestic division in the Polish football league system since its establishment in 1927 and the 11th season of the Ekstraklasa under its current title. The league was operated by the Ekstraklasa SA.

The season started on 20 July 2018 and concluded on 19 May 2019. It is the second Ekstraklasa season to use VAR. After the 20th matchday the league went on a winter break between 23 December 2018 and 8 February 2019. The regular season was played as a round-robin tournament. A total of 16 teams participated, 14 of which competed in the league during the 2017–18 season, while the remaining two were promoted from the 2017–18 I liga. The fixtures were announced on 22 March 2018.

Each team played a total of 30 matches, half at home and half away. After the 30th round (in the beginning of April 2019), the league was split into two groups: championship round (top eight teams) and relegation round (bottom eight teams). Each team played 7 more games (teams ranked 1 to 4 and 9 to 12 played four times at home). Therefore, each team played a total of 37 matches. The team at the top of the Championship round won the league title. The two teams at the bottom of the Relegation round were relegated to 2019–20 I liga. This was the sixth season to take place since the new playoff structure has been introduced.

The defending champions were Legia Warsaw, who won their 13th Polish title the previous season. Piast Gliwice succeeded Legia, winning its first ever Polish top league title.

Teams
Sixteen teams will compete in the league – the top fourteen teams from the previous season, as well as two teams promoted from the I liga. Miedź Legnica were promoted to the Ekstraklasa for the first time. Zagłębie Sosnowiec will make a return to the Ekstraklasa for the first time since 2008.

Stadiums and locations
Note: Table lists in alphabetical order.

 Upgrading to 31,871.

Personnel and kits

Managerial changes

Regular season

League table

Positions by round

Results

Results by round

Play-offs

Championship round

League table

Positions by round

Results

Relegation round

League table

Positions by round

Results

Season statistics

Top goalscorers

Top assists

Hat-tricks

Attendances

Awards

Annual awards

Notes

References

External links
 
Ekstraklasa at uefa.com

2018-19
Pol
1